The Civil Procedure Acts Repeal Act 1879 (42 & 43 Vict c 59) is an Act of the Parliament of the United Kingdom. It is a public general Act. The Bill for this Act was the Civil Procedure Acts Repeal Bill.

This Act was repealed by section 1 of, and the First Schedule to, the Statute Law Revision Act 1958.

This Act was repealed for the Republic of Ireland by sections 2(1) and 3(1) of, and Part 4 of Schedule 2 to, the Statute Law Revision Act 2007.

Section 7 of the Statute Law Revision and Civil Procedure Act 1883 provided that if and so far as any enactment repealed by this Act applied, or may have been by Order in Council applied, to the court of the county palatine of Lancaster, or to any inferior court of civil jurisdiction, such enactment was to be construed as if it were contained in a Local and Personal Act specially relating to such court, and was to have effect accordingly.

As to sections 2 and 4, see Snelling v Pulling.

Preamble
The preamble was repealed by section 1 of, and the First Schedule to, the Statute Law Revision Act 1894.

Section 3 - Abolition of outlawry in civil proceedings
The words from the beginning of this section to the word "Act" were repealed by section 1 of, and the First Schedule to, the Statute Law Revision Act 1894.

Section 4 - Saving as to repealed enactments
As to section 4(1), see Hanak v Green.

In section 4(2), the words from "and shall not" to the end were repealed by section 1 of, and the First Part of the Schedule to, the Statute Law Revision Act 1898.

Section 4(3) was repealed by section 1 of, and the First Part of the Schedule to, the Statute Law Revision Act 1898.

Schedule - Enactments repealed
This Schedule was repealed by section 1 of, and the First Schedule to, the Statute Law Revision Act 1894.

The enactments mentioned in Part II of this Schedule were repealed by section 4 of the Statute Law Revision and Civil Procedure Act 1883.

See also
Statute Law Revision Act

References
"The Civil Procedure Acts Repeal Act, 1879". Halsbury's Statutes of England. (The Complete Statutes of England). First Edition. Butterworth & Co (Publishers) Ltd. 1930. Volume 13. Pages 206 and 207. See also page 114.
The Statutes Revised. Third Edition. HMSO. London. 1950. Vol X. Pages 211 and 212.
John Mounteney Lely. "The Civil Procedure Acts Repeal Act, 1879". The Statutes of Practical Utility. (Chitty's Statutes). Fifth Edition. Sweet and Maxwell. Stevens and Sons. London. 1895. Volume 6. Title "Judicature". Pages 61 to 66. Chitty's Collection of Statutes of Practical Utility. Fourth Edition. Volume 3. Pages 775 to 779.
The Public General Statutes passed in the Forty-Second and Forty-Third Years of the Reign of Her Majesty Queen Victoria, 1879. Queen's Printer. East Harding Street, London. 1879. Pages 296 to 306.
J M Lely. "Civil Procedure Acts Repeal Acts". Wharton's Law-Lexicon. Ninth Edition. Stevens and Sons Limited. Chancery Lane, London. 1892. Page 142. See also "Outlawry", p 533.
"How the Statute Book is Incumbered" (1890) 88 The Law Times 359 (22 March 1890)
Ilbert, Courtenay P. The Supreme Court of Judicature (Officers) Act, 1879 (42 & 43 Vict. c. 78). Stevens and Sons. Chancery Lane, London. 1880. Page 18.
Thomas J Bullen and Charles Walter Clifford. Bullen and Leake's Precedents of Pleadings. Fourth Edition. Stevens and Sons. Chancery Lane, London. 1888. Part 2. Pages 3 and 464.
Charles Burney, Montague Johnstone Muir Mackenzie and Sir Charles Arnold White. Wilson's Practice of the Supreme Court of Judicature. Seventh Edition. Stevens and Sons Limited. Chancery Lane, London. 1888. Page 473.
"Solicitor's Journal" (1879) 67 The Law Times 347 (13 September 1879)
Sheelagh McCracken. The Banker's Remedy of Set-Off. Butterworths. 1993. Page 57.

External links
Civil Procedure Acts Repeal Act 1879 (PDF) original text from Parliament of Namibia website
List of amendments and repeals in the Republic of Ireland from the Irish Statute Book

United Kingdom Acts of Parliament 1879